Dendrobium collinsii, commonly known as the McIlwraith burr orchid, is an epiphytic orchid in the family Orchidaceae and is endemic to tropical North Queensland. It has a single fleshy, dark green leaf on a cylindrical stem and a small white flower that does not open widely. It grows on small trees on ridges on the eastern side of the ranges.

Description 
Dendrobium collinsii is an epiphytic herb that usually forms small clumps. Flowering occurs between December and April but the flower does not open widely, is short-lived and self-pollinated.

Taxonomy and naming
The McIlwraith burr orchid was first formally described in 1981 by Peter Lavarack from a specimen collected near Rocky River on the Cape York Peninsula. It was given the name Cadetia collinsii and the description was published in the journal Austrobaileya. In 2011, André Schuiteman and Peter Adams changed the name to Dendrobium collinsii, referring to studies of molecular phylogenetics. The specific epithet (collinsii) honours "Rev. R. Collins of Atherton who encouraged the author in his early studies of Australian orchids".

Distribution and habitat
Dendrobium collinsii grows on small trees on ridges, slopes and gorges on the eastern side of the McIlwraith, Janet and Iron Ranges.

References

collinsii
Orchids of Queensland
Plants described in 1981